Karl Gustaf Vilhelm Staaf (April 6, 1881 – February 15, 1953) was a Swedish track and field athlete and tug of war competitor who competed at the 1900 Summer Olympics. He was born in Stockholm and died in Motala.

He finished seventh in the pole vault competition and fifth in the hammer throw event. In the triple jump event and in the standing triple jump event his exact results are unknown.

He also participated on the Dano-Swedish tug of war team which won the gold medal against opponents France. These were the first Olympic gold medals for Sweden.

See also
 Dual sport and multi-sport Olympians

References

External links

1881 births
1953 deaths
Swedish male hammer throwers
Swedish male pole vaulters
Swedish male triple jumpers
Athletes from Stockholm
Athletes (track and field) at the 1900 Summer Olympics
Tug of war competitors at the 1900 Summer Olympics
Olympic athletes of Sweden
Olympic tug of war competitors of Sweden
Olympic gold medalists for Sweden
Olympic medalists in tug of war
Medalists at the 1900 Summer Olympics